Solos is an American dramatic anthology streaming television miniseries created by David Weil and produced by Amazon Studios. It stars Morgan Freeman, Anne Hathaway, Helen Mirren, Uzo Aduba, Anthony Mackie, Constance Wu, Dan Stevens and Nicole Beharie. The seven-episode series premiered on May 21, 2021 on Amazon Prime Video in UK, United States, Australia, Canada, Ireland, India, New Zealand and later that year in additional territories.

Premise
The series ponders what it means to be human, arguing that we are connected to others through shared experiences, even in our most isolated moments.

Cast
 Morgan Freeman as Stuart, a patient in an Alzheimer's facility, later revealed to be a memory thief/junkie (by either hacking or by force). His confirmed thefts are Leah, Tom, Peg, Sasha, and Otto, whose memories he stole when Otto was a child, amongst hundreds of other victims. Freeman's character narrates the beginning of each episode and appears in his own.
 Anne Hathaway as Leah, a scientist in 2024 trying to attempt time travel using "the Cauchy horizon"
 Anthony Mackie as Tom, an angry businessman who is later revealed to be the adoptive father of Peg.  He also plays a robot designed to replace him when he dies.
 Helen Mirren as Peg, a senior citizen who joins a space program because she felt invisible. Tom is her adoptive father.
 Uzo Aduba as Sasha, a woman who has lived in her smart house for 20 years and thinks it is trying to trick her to leave.
 Constance Wu as Jenny, a self-loathing, self-destructive woman who is in a waiting room and doesn't know why 
 Nicole Beharie as Nera, a pregnant woman who gives birth during a blizzard lockdown to a son who ages quickly
 Dan Stevens as Otto, an NHS worker who steals a cure for Stuart to repair his Alzheimer's, later revealed that Stuart stole all his memories as a child on the day his mother died ("Stuart"). Stevens also voices Tym, the AI Space Shuttle in Peg's episode

Co-starring
 Hannah Dunne as the voice of Leah's sister Rachel ("Leah")
 Carol Smolinsky as the voice of Leah's mother ("Leah")
 Jack Quaid as the voice of Zen, Sasha's smart house ("Sasha")
 Sanaa Lathan as Nia, Sasha's best friend ("Sasha")
 Chris Diamantopoulos as the technician downloading Jenny's memories ("Jenny")		
 James Monroe Iglehart as the voice of the supervising technician overseeing the procedure ("Jenny")
 Jacob is played by McCarrie McCausland at 15, Sephen Gray at 2, Percy Daggs IV at 6, and Andre Robinson at 11 ("Nera")

Episodes

Production
Amazon Studios greenlighted the series in October 2020. In February 2021, the title was announced. Weil is executive producer, and Laura Lancaster, Sam Taylor-Johnson and Pixie Wespiser produced. Weil makes his directorial debut directing three episodes and Taylor-Johnson directs two. Other directors for the series include Zach Braff and Tiffany Johnson. The cast was announced in February 2021, and their characters' names were announced in April 2021. Principal photography took place in Manhattan Beach, California from October 9 to November 19, 2020.

Release
The series debuted on Amazon Prime Video on May 21, 2021, for the UK, United States, Australia, Canada, Ireland, India, New Zealand. Other territories debuted later that year.

Reception
On Rotten Tomatoes, the miniseries holds an approval rating of 47% based on 30 critic reviews and an average rating of 5.85/10. The website's critical consensus reads, "A star-studded cast and a smattering of truly lovely moments can't save Solos from feeling stranded in space." On Metacritic, it has a weighted average score of 45 out of 100 based on 14 critic reviews, indicating "mixed or average reviews".

References

External links
 

2021 American television series debuts
2020s American anthology television series
2020s American drama television series
Amazon Prime Video original programming
English-language television shows
Television series by Amazon Studios